Kelly Nonhlanhla Khumalo (born November 11, 1982) is a South African singer, songwriter, actress, and dancer. Born and raised in Nquthu, KwaZulu-Natal, she was discovered while performing at a gospel talent search and signed a record deal with Bonsai Entertainment, released her debut studio album T.K.O (2005). She shot to fame after the release  of her debut album T.K.O (2005). She was named the Best Newcomer of 2005 in the Afro Pop music circuit. The Past, The Present, The Future album was released on 5 November 2012. In May 2013, She scooped  award    at the 19th South African Music Awards.

Khumalo's ninth album  The Voice of Africa (2020), which incorporated elements of R&B, gospel and Afro pop. The album was certified gold in South Africa.

Life and career
Kelly  Khumalo  was born in Katlehong and moved to KwaZulu-Natal. She relocated to Gauteng in 1997.

T.K.O (2005), Itshitshi (2006)  
Kelly debut solo album T.K.O was released  on  August 19, 2005, in South Africa, and earned her two nominations  Song of the Year and Best Afro Pop album at 2006 South African Music Awards.

On  September 27, 2006, her second  studio album Itshitshi was released.

The Past, The Present, The Future (2012), Back to My Roots(2014), My Truth (2016), Unleashed (2018) 
On  November 5, 2012, The Past, The Present, The Future album was released in  South Africa. At the 19th SAMA awards  (2013) her album  The Past, The Present, The Future won the Best Female Artist of the Year award.

In October 2014, the single  "Asine" was  released  and  nominated for Song of The Year  at Metro FM Awards (2015), and her album, Back to my Roots for  Best African Pop Album and nominated for Best African Adult Album at South African Music Awards XXXI (2015).

Kelly began recording her seventh studio  album in March 2016. On October 28, 2016, her seventh studio album My Truth was released. My Truth won Best Female Album at 2017 Metro FM Awards.

In January 2018, Kelly began to work on her eighth studio album, and released its lead single "Jehovah" on July 9, 2018, featuring J F.L.O.

On October 9, she announced second single "Dance Comigo" on her instagram, which was released on October 12, 2018.

On November 5, 2018, her album Unleashed was released in South Africa. The album was produced by Mondli Ngcobo.

2020-present: The Voice of Africa, Gospel Explosion Concert, Upcoming album 
In August 28, her single  "Empini" was released as album's lead single. The song was certified gold by the Recording Industry of South Africa with sales of 80 000 units  and garnered 12 million  views on YouTube. Her ninth studio album The Voice of Africa was released on October 9, 2020. Production was handled by Mondli Ngcobo. The Voice of Africa was certified gold with sales of 25 000 units in South Africa. At 6th ceremony of All Africa Music Awards, her single "Empini" received nomination for Best Female Artist in South Africa.

"Esiphambaweni" featuring South African singer Hlengiwe Mhlaba, peaked number one in the gospel charts. At 27th South African Music Awards The Voice of  Africa received  a nomination as Best Afro-pop Album.

In November 2021, she recorded  The Voice of Africa live version. 

In April 2022, Khumalo performed at her first annual Gospel Explosion Concert, includes two dates, 15-16 April  held at the Lyric Theatre in Johannesburg. 

In April 28, following the success of 2 dates, she added one more date that were held at Vaal on May 28.

In late August 2022, Kelly announced From A God To A King tour, scheduled to start off on Saturday 17 September at Carnival City, Boksburg. 

Khumalo also announced her 10th upcoming album From A God To A King.

"Bazokhuluma" featuring Zakwe and Mthunzi was released on November 4, 2022, as album's lead single.

Television
In 2021, she started her reality show Life with Kelly Khumalo airs on Showmax.
In September 2021, she appeared on House of Zwide, television sopie airs on etv.

In September 2021, Khumalo was announced as Judge on Stand Up S.A.

Towards the end of 2021, she was a guest judge on Idols South Africa season 17.

In early April 2022, she was announced as a competitor on Tropika Island of Treasure, season 10.

Controversies 
On 26 October 2014, her boyfriend Senzo Meyiwa captain of the South Africa men's national football team and club side Orlando Pirates with whom she has a child was shot dead in her presence at her family's home in Vosloorus. It is alleged  that the killer is known to Khumalo and everyone present at the shooting but she has remained silent on who the killer is.

In October 2020, five men were charged with murdering Meyiwa. The suspects denied that they were involved in the killing.

Personal life 
Speaking out about having been in an abusive relationship, in 2012 she became an advocate against domestic violence. The singer confessed to being a drug addict for at least two years during her relationship with the singer Molemo Maarohanye, she attended Narcotics Anonymous meetings.

Discography

Studio albums

As lead artist

Filmography
 Zulu Wedding (2017)
 uSkroef No Sexy: In Kgantse And Kenny's Paradise
 Life with Kelly Khumalo (2021)
 Stand Up South Africa as Judge 
 Idols South Africa as Guest Judge
 ''Rhythm City" as Sunay

Awards and nominations

References

"Gospel Song Release - Esphambanweni featuring Dr Hlengiwe Mhlaba", AmenRadio, 12 Sept 2020.

External links
 TVSA Actor Profile
 Snaparazzi Gallery
 "The Past The Present The Future of Kelly Khumalo (21.5.2013)". YouTube.
 
 "Esphambanweni – Kelly Khumalo featuring Hlengiwe Mhlaba (12.10.2020)". AmenRadio.

Living people
South African actresses
21st-century South African women singers
1984 births